Bruce Thomson may refer to:

Bruce Thomson (footballer) (born 1955), Australian former rules footballer
Bruce Thomson (rugby union) (born 1930), Scottish former international rugby union player

See also
 Bruce Thompson (disambiguation)